James Burton is a former professional American football player who played defensive back for four seasons for the  Chicago Bears.

References

1972 births
Living people
Players of American football from Torrance, California
American football cornerbacks
Fresno State Bulldogs football players
Chicago Bears players
Long Beach Polytechnic High School alumni